, somyeon, or sùmiàn is a very thin noodle made of wheat flour, less than 1.3 mm in diameter. The noodles are used extensively in East Asian cuisines. Japanese sōmen is made by stretching the dough with vegetable oil, forming thin strands that are then air dried for later use. This is distinct from a similar thin noodle, hiyamugi, which is knife-cut.

In Japan, sōmen is usually served cold with a light dipping sauce called tsuyu. South Korean somyeon may be eaten in hot or cold noodle soups. Sōmen is typically high in sodium.

Other names are nyūmen (煮麺) in Japanese, for a version served warm in soup, and the Chinese name guàmiàn, which can be further classified into lóngxū for the variant with long and thin strands and fèngwei for the variant with flat and broad strands.

East Asian cuisines

Japan 

Sōmen are usually served cold with a light flavored dipping sauce or tsuyu. The tsuyu is usually a katsuobushi-based sauce that can be flavored with Japanese bunching onion, ginger, or myoga. In the summer, sōmen chilled with ice is a popular meal to help stay cool.

Sōmen served in hot soup is usually called nyūmen and eaten in the winter, just like soba or udon are.

Some restaurants offer nagashi-sōmen (流しそうめん flowing noodles) in the summer. The noodles are placed in a long flume of bamboo across the length of the restaurant. The flume carries clear, ice-cold water. As the sōmen pass by, diners pluck them out with their chopsticks and dip them in tsuyu. Catching the noodles requires a fair amount of dexterity, but the noodles that are not caught by the time they get to the end usually are not eaten, so diners are pressured to catch as much as they can. A few luxury establishments put their sōmen in real streams so that diners can enjoy their meal in a beautiful garden setting. Machines have been designed to simulate this experience at home.

South Korea 
In Korean cuisine, somyeon is used in hot and cold noodles soups such as janchi-guksu (banquet noodles) and kong-guksu (noodles in cold soybean soup), as well as soupless noodle dishes such as bibim-guksu (mixed noodles). It is often served with spicy anju (food that accompanies alcoholic drink) such as golbaengi-muchim (moon snail salad).

Gallery

See also

Capellini - Italian pasta with similar thinness
Hiyashi chūka
Sōmen salad

References

External links

Chinese noodles
Cold noodles
East Asian noodles
Japanese noodles
Korean noodles